Karonga, a township in the Karonga District in the Northern Region of Malawi.

Karonga may also refer to:
Karonga District, a district in the Northern Region of Malawi
Karonga Airport, airport serving Karonga
Karonga War, a number of armed clashes between 1887 and 1889 in and around Karonga

Electoral Constituencies of the Parliament of Malawi
Karonga Central (Malawi Parliament constituency)
Karonga North (Malawi Parliament constituency)
Karonga North West (Malawi Parliament constituency)
Karonga Nyungwe (Malawi Parliament constituency)
Karonga South (Malawi Parliament constituency)

See also
Karongasaurus, a genus of dinosaurs